The Gay Anties is a 1947 Warner Bros. Merrie Melodies cartoon short directed by Friz Freleng and written by Michael Maltese and Tedd Pierce. The short was released on February 15, 1947. The title is a play on words for the "Gay Nineties", a phrase that references the 1890s United States.

Plot
A colony of ants surreptitiously invade a young couple's park picnic in the 1890s and contrive to steal their food. The gags include a scene in which the ants, frustrated three times in their efforts to make off with a sandwich, spread mustard on the back of the girlfriend's hand and trick the boyfriend into biting it, and one in which a female ant sings an overly melodramatic song ("Time Waits for No One") which gets the other ants to run for cover.

References

External links
 Internet Movie Database article at 
 Big Cartoon Database article at 

1947 animated films
1947 short films
1947 films
1940s Warner Bros. animated short films
Merrie Melodies short films
Films set in the 1890s
Warner Bros. Cartoons animated short films
Short films directed by Friz Freleng
Animated films about insects
Films scored by Carl Stalling
Films with screenplays by Michael Maltese
Films about ants
Picnic films